Zoë Jenny (born 1974 in Basel, Switzerland) is a Swiss writer. Her first novel, The Pollen Room, was published in German in 1997 and has been translated into 27 languages. She lived in London. In 2008, she married Matthew Homfray, a British veterinary surgeon and pharmaceuticals consultant. Her newest novel, The Sky is Changing, was her first written in English and was published by Legend Press in June 2010. She was awarded the Aspekte-Literaturpreis.

Jenny lives in Vienna.

Bibliography

For children

Written in English

English translations

References

External links 
 

1974 births
Living people
Swiss women novelists
20th-century Swiss novelists
German-language writers
21st-century Swiss novelists
21st-century Swiss women writers
20th-century Swiss women writers